Gukje Digital University is a private university located in Suwon, Paldal-gu, South Korea.

Notable people
Choi Whee-sung, R&B singer, record producer, and musical theatre actor.
Kang Dae-sung, actor and vocalist of Kpop boy-group Bigbang
Kang Seung-yoon, singer-songwriter, dancer, record producer, actor, and leader and vocalist of Kpop boy group Winner
Kwon Ji-yong, singer-songwriter, rapper, record producer, entrepreneur and fashion icon, and leader of Kpop boy group Bigbang

External links
Gukje Digital University

References

Universities and colleges in Suwon
Private universities and colleges in South Korea
Educational institutions established in 2003
2003 establishments in South Korea